Onondaga Township may refer to the following places:

In Canada
 Onondaga Township, Ontario, a historical township of Brant County

In the United States
 Onondaga Township, Michigan

See also

Onondaga (disambiguation)

	

Township name disambiguation pages